If You Cut Us, We Bleed is an EP by San Diego band The Plot to Blow Up the Eiffel Tower, released on the Happy Couples Never Last label on March 9, 2004.

Track listing
"For Francis" – 1:52
"If You Cut Us, We Bleed" – 2:28
"Green Cars" – 2:43

Personnel
Brandon Welchez - Vocals/Saxophone
Dan Maier - Bass/Mastering/Mixing
Brian Hill - Drums

The Plot to Blow Up the Eiffel Tower albums
2004 EPs